Podgorica Capital City (Montenegrin: Glavni grad Podgorica / Главни град Подгорица) is one of the territorial subdivisions of Montenegro. The seat of municipality is the city of Podgorica. Podgorica municipality covers 10.4% of Montenegro's territory and is home to 29.9% of the country's population. It is the nation's administrative centre and its economic and educational focus.

Administration

As with other Montenegrin municipalities, the city and the municipality of Podgorica are governed by the same Mayor and City Assembly, which together act as a Capital City government.  The city assembly has 60 members, elected directly for four-year terms.  The Mayor of Podgorica is the head of the City of Podgorica, acts on behalf of the city, and performs an executive function in the Podgorica Capital City municipality.

City Assembly composition

City Assembly

Subdivisions

Municipality of Podgorica is the only Montenegrin municipality to have city municipality (Montenegrin Latin: gradska opština) - Golubovci (and Tuzi until 2018). Those are semi-independent municipalities, with limited self-governing powers. The entire municipality of Podgorica is further divided into 57 local communities (Montenegrin Latin: mjesne zajednice, singular: mjesna zajednica), bodies in which the citizens participate in decisions on matters of relevance to the local community.

Geography and location
The municipality of Podgorica is located in central eastern part of Montenegro, covering an area of 1,441 km2, thus being the second largest Montenegrin municipality, after Nikšić. It occupies the area north of Lake Skadar, including the entire Zeta Plain, and stretches north into the sparsely populated Dinaric Alps. Thus, the municipality occupies geographically very diverse area, ranging from the fertile lowlands in the south, to the rugged mountain ranges in the north.

Demographics
Podgorica municipality can be viewed as the metropolitan area of the city of Podgorica. Population of the municipality was 185,937 at 2011 census, while the City proper had 150,977 citizens.

Gallery

References

Municipalities of Montenegro